Fútbol Club Universitario de Vinto, known as Universitario de Vinto, is a Bolivian football club based in Vinto. Founded in 2005, it plays in the Bolivian División Profesional after being promoted for the 2022 season by winning the Copa Simón Bolívar the previous campaign.

History
Initially founded as a university team in the early 2000s, the club was officially founded as a professional side on 23 March 2005, the day it was affiliated to the Asociación Municipal de Fútbol Vinto. They first played in the Copa Simón Bolívar in 2017, being knocked out in the group stage.

Universitario de Vinto reached the second stage of the Simón Bolívar in 2018, but did not appear in the 2019 and 2020 campaigns after failing to qualify. They returned to the national second division in 2021, and won the title after defeating Universitario de Sucre in the Final.

Honours
Copa Simón Bolívar:
Winners (1): 2021

References

External links
  
 Soccerway team profile

Football clubs in Bolivia
Association football clubs established in 2005
2005 establishments in Bolivia